Shirakawa Dam is a rockfill dam located in Yamagata Prefecture in Japan. The dam is used for flood control, irrigation, water supply and power production. The catchment area of the dam is 205 km2. The dam impounds about 270  ha of land when full and can store 50000 thousand cubic meters of water. The construction of the dam was started on 1968 and completed in 1981.

References

Dams in Yamagata Prefecture
1981 establishments in Japan